The Hamilton County Courthouse is a historic building in Aurora, Nebraska, and the courthouse for Hamilton County, Nebraska. It replaced the 1877 courthouse, which in turn replaced the 1870 courthouse. This third courthouse was built in 1894, and designed in the Richardsonian Romanesque style by architect William Gray. It has been listed on the National Register of Historic Places since July 29, 1985.

References

National Register of Historic Places in Hamilton County, Nebraska
Romanesque Revival architecture in Nebraska
Government buildings completed in 1894
1894 establishments in Nebraska